Garcinia macrophylla, common name: pungara, is a Garcinia species found in southern Mexico, Guatemala and northern South America. It is found in the Amazonian montane forests, at altitudes of 50–400 m. In climates with mean annual temperatures of 26–28 °C and mean annual rainfall of 1,500–4,000 mm. In Bolivia, this species is intercropped with cocoa for their edible fruits and shade.

References

External links

macrophylla